Gregor Vietz (born 26 June 1890 in Berlin, date of death unknown) was a German track and field athlete who competed in the 1912 Summer Olympics.

In 1912 he finished 27th in the individual cross country event. In the 5000 metres competition as well as of the 10000 metres event he was eliminated in the first round. He was also a member of the German team which was eliminated in the first round of the 3000 metres team race by Sweden.

References

External links
list of German athletes

1890 births
Year of death missing
Athletes from Berlin
German male middle-distance runners
German male long-distance runners
Olympic athletes of Germany
Athletes (track and field) at the 1912 Summer Olympics
Olympic cross country runners